Dempsey is a surname of Irish origin.

Background
Dempsey is an anglicised form of Ó Díomasaigh, 'descendant of Díomasach'; this personal name is the Irish adjective díomasach 'proud'. The family originated in the Kingdom of Uí Failghe.

According to John Grenham:

Another source states:

Descent
An Ó Diomasaigh genealogy records the following:
 
Flann m. Máel Ruanaid m. Cellaich m. Máel Augra m. Conchobuir m. Áeda m. Tomaltajich m. Flaind m. Díumasaich m. Congaile m. Forannáin m. Congaile m. Máel h-Umai m. Cathail m. Bruidge m. Nath Í m. Rosa Failgi.

The final person may be identical with Failge Berraide (fl. 507–514), a king of the Uí Failghe and of Laigin descent.

A new bloodline has been recently traced to when the Dempseys came to America. When the family known as the Dempseys got off the boat, they were asked their legal names by American officials, who would put them in the American records, making them a citizen, it was misspelled Dimsey, therefore creating the Dimsey bloodline. Another group of the family came on the boat, and was correctly identified as Dempsey, leading to the American Dempsey bloodline. Similarly, Dempcy dating back to the Revolutionary War, was also a misspelling of Dempsey.

Dempseys in the annals
The Irish annals list a number of members of the family:

 789:  Áedh [grandfather of Máelaugrai] was slain by Óengus son of Mugrón, king of Uí Failghe, in the oratory of Kilclonfert.
 1141: Donnchadh, son of Goll Gaibhle, i.e. Ua Conchobhair Failghe, was killed by the Uí Failghe themselves, i.e. the Clann-Maelughra.
 1161: Domhnall, son of Conghalach, son of Cuaifne Ua Conchobhair Failghe, Tanist of Uí Failghe, was slain by the Clann-Maelughra.
 1164: Maelseachlainn Ua Conchobhair Failghe, was slain by the Clann-Maelughra.
 1193: Diarmait, son of Cubrogam Ua Diumasaigh, chief of Clann-Mailighra and king of Uí Failghe for a long time, died.
 1383: Dermot O'Dempsy, Lord of Kinel-Maoilughra, was slain by the English.
 1394: Thomas O'Dempsy, heir to the lordship of Clann-Maoilughra, was slain by the English.

Other Dempsey families
An unrelated family, rendered in Irish as Mac Diomasaigh, are found in County Antrim and its neighbouring counties.

Bearers of the name

Notable people with the surname Dempsey include:
 Amy Dempsey (born 1963), American art historian
 Bill Dempsey (born 1942), former Australian rules footballer
 Bill Dempsey (footballer) (1896–1967), English footballer
 Candace Dempsey, American author, journalist and travel writer
 Cedric Dempsey, former American sports executive
 Chester Dempsey (1896–1969) American farmer and politician
 Clint Dempsey (born 1983), American soccer player
 Courtenay Dempsey (born 1987), Australian rules footballer
 Damien Dempsey, Irish singer and songwriter
 Dan Dempsey, Australian rugby league footballer
 Denis Dempsey (1826–1896), Irish soldier, recipient of the Victoria Cross
 Donald Dempsey (c. 1932 – 2005), American recording executive
 Ed Dempsey, Canadian ice hockey coach
 Frank Dempsey (1925–2013), American football player
 Gary Dempsey, multiple people
 George Dempsey, multiple people
 Girvan Dempsey (born 1975), Irish rugby union footballer
 Henry Dempsey, pilot who survived being sucked out of an airborne Beechcraft 99 aircraft in 1987
 Holli Dempsey, British actor
 Ian Dempsey (born 1961), Irish radio presenter
 Jack Dempsey (1895–1983), American boxer
 Jack Dempsey (disambiguation), other people with this name
 James Dempsey (disambiguation), multiple people
 Jeremiah Dempsey (disambiguation), multiple people with this name
 Jillian Dempsey (born 1991), American ice hockey player
 Jillian Lee Dempsey, American inorganic chemist
 John Dempsey, multiple people
 Judy Dempsey (born 1956), Irish journalist and researcher
 Julia Dempsey (known as Sister Mary Joseph Dempsey), American religious sister, nurse and hospital administrator
 Lawrence Dempsey (died 1690), an Irish soldier
 Lorcan Dempsey (born 1958), Irish library information expert
 Luke Dempsey (born 1979/1980), Irish Gaelic football manager
 Mark Dempsey, multiple people
 Martin Dempsey (born 1952), American general, 18th chairman, US Joint Chiefs of Staff
 Michael Dempsey, multiple people
 Mick Dempsey, Irish Gaelic footballer
 Miles Dempsey (1896–1969), British general of World War II
 Nathan Dempsey (born 1974), Canadian ice hockey player
 Nick Dempsey (born 1980), English windsurfer
 Nicola Dempsey (fl. 2015–), one half of comedy duo Flo and Joan
 Noel Dempsey (born 1953), Irish politician
 Nonpareil Dempsey (1862–1895), ring name of Irish-born American boxer John Kelly
 Patrick Dempsey (born 1966), American actor and race car driver 
 Paul Dempsey (born 1976), Australian rock musician
 Ray Dempsey, Irish Gaelic footballer
 Rey Dempsey, retired American college football coach
 Richard Dempsey (born 1974), English actor
 Rick Dempsey (born 1949), retired American baseball player
 Rosemary Dempsey, American feminist activist
 Rosie Dempsey (fl. 2015–), one half of comedy duo Flo and Joan
 Sandra Dempsey, Canadian playwright
 Sandy Dempsey (1949–1975), actress 
 Shawna Dempsey, Canadian performance artist
 S. Wallace Dempsey (1862–1949), American Republican politician, Congressman 1915–1931
 Thomas Dempsey (disambiguation) or Tom Dempsey, multiple people
 Tommy Dempsey, American college basketball coach
 Tony Dempsey (born 1944), Irish Fianna Fáil politician, TD 2002–2007
 Travis Demsey, born Travis Dempsey, Australian musician

As a given name:
 Dempsey Bob (born 1948), Canadian woodcarver
 Dempsey Burges (1751–1800), American politician, Congressman 1795–1799
 Dempsey Wilson (1927–1971), American racecar driver
 P. Dempsey Tabler (1876–1956), American actor, athlete and businessman

Fictional Characters: 
 "Tank" Dempsey (born before 1917), fictional U.S Marine from [[Call_of_Duty:_Black_Ops#Zombies_2|Call of Duty: Black Ops'''s Zombies mode]]
 Zach Dempsey, a character in the novel and Netflix series 13 Reasons WhyExternal links
 http://www.fair-trade-usa.com/dempsey-clan/history-dempsey-ireland.htm
 http://www.henneberry.org/dunn/dempsey.htm
 http://genforum.genealogy.com/dempsey/
 http://boards.ancestry.netscape.com/surnames.dempsey/304.341/mb.ashx

References

 Matthews, Thomas (1903) Account of the O'Dempseys, Chiefs of Clan Maliere''

Patronymic surnames
Irish families
Surnames of Irish origin
Families of Irish ancestry
Anglicised Irish-language surnames